Elections in Sikkim have been held in the Indian state of Sikkim between 1953 and 1974, before its integration with India, and since 1979 after its integration. The total number of seats in the assembly is 32, including one seat reserved for the Sangha.

Assembly Elections

General elections 
The general elections took place before Sikkim's integration with India.

1953

1958

1967

1970

1973

1974

Legislative Assembly elections

1979

1985

1989

1994

1999

2004

2009

2014 

|-
!colspan=2|Political Party
!Candidates
!Numberof Votes
!Seats Won
!Net Changein seats
!% of Votes
|-
| 
||32||169983||22||10|| 55.0%
|-
| 
|32||126024||10||10||40.8%
|-
| 
|32||4390||0||0||1.4%
|-
| 
|13||2208||0||0||0.7%
|-
| 
|7||586||0||0||0.2%
|-
| 
|5||1227||0||0||0.4
|-
| 
| ||4460||-||-||1.4%
|-
|- class="unsortable"
!colspan=2| Total !! !!478,861!! 32!! !!

2019

Loksabha Election

References